Nonio is a comune (municipality) in the Province of Verbano-Cusio-Ossola in the Italian region Piedmont, located about  northeast of Turin and about  southwest of Verbania.

Nonio borders the following municipalities: Cesara, Omegna, Pella, Pettenasco, Quarna Sotto, Varallo.

References

Cities and towns in Piedmont